Vadim Glowna (26 September 1941 – 24 January 2012) was a German actor and film director. Since 1964, he appeared in more than 150 films and television shows.

He directed the 1983 film Dies rigorose Leben, which won an Honourable Mention at the 33rd Berlin International Film Festival. In 1989, he was a member of the jury at the 39th Berlin International Film Festival. Three years later, his film Rising to the Bait was entered into the 42nd Berlin International Film Festival.

Selected filmography
Actor

 Immensee (1943), as Baby (uncredited)
 Im Schatten einer Großstadt (1965, TV film), as Johnny
 Frühlings Erwachen (1966, TV film), as Melchior Gabor
 Zuchthaus (1967, TV film), as Robert Labitzke
 Verbrechen mit Vorbedacht (1967, TV film), as Anton Katz
 Liebe und so weiter (1968), as Rob Studebecker
 Tramp oder Der einzige und unvergleichliche Lenny Jacobson (1968, TV film), as Guido
 Horror (1969, TV film), as Alex
 11 Uhr 20 (1970, TV miniseries), as Lassowski
 The Body in the Thames (1971), as David Armstrong
 Dog's Heart (1976), as Schwonder
 Police Python 357 (1976), as Inspector Abadie
 Sladek oder Die schwarze Armee (1976, TV film), as Franz
  (1977)
 Cross of Iron (1977), as Gefreiter (Pvt.) Kern
 Group Portrait with a Lady (1977), as Erhard Schweigert
  (1977), as Max Schneider
 The Tailor from Ulm (1978), as Kaspar Fesslen
 Das verschollene Inka-Gold  (1978, TV film), as Brian Jones
 Germany in Autumn (1978), as Freiermuth
 Bloodline (1979), as Dr. Emile Joeppli
 The Associate (1979), as Marc Duphorin
 Tales from the Vienna Woods (1979), as Beichtvater
 The Martian Chronicles (1980, TV miniseries), as Sam Hinkston
 Death Watch (1980), as Harry Graves
 Exil (1981, TV miniseries), as Fritz Benjamin
 Desperado City (1981), as Paul
 High Society Limited (1982), as Raimund
 Daimler-Benz Limousine (1982), as German Consul von Ziegler
 Dies rigorose Leben (1983), as Bräutigam
  (1983), as Paul Baumeister
  (1984, TV Movie), as Dr. Felix Schaad 
 A Year of the Quiet Sun (1984), as Herman
  (1986, TV film), as Helmut Halm
 Tarot (1986), as Autofahrer
  (1987), as Kapitän Davidson
  (1987, TV miniseries), as Otchenko
  (1988), as German professor
  (1988), as Juror
 The Play with Billions (1989, TV film), as Zurstiege
 Er – Sie – Es (1989), as Professor Leitner
  (1989), as Kaufmann
 Quiet Days in Clichy (1990)
 L'assassina (1990), as Gambrini
 The Second Life (1990, TV film), as Donald Anders
 Die Spitzen der Gesellschaft (1990), as Zupan
 Extralarge: Miami Killer (1991, TV series episode), as Silveth
 Dunckel (1998, TV film), as Karl Dunckel
 No Place to Go (2000), as Bruno
 Cold Is the Evening Breeze (2000), as Eberhard Hoffmann
 Les Misérables (2000, TV miniseries), as Fauchelevent
 Viktor Vogel – Commercial Man (2001), as Werner Stahl
 Endstation Tanke (2001), as Neumann
 Planet der Kannibalen (2001), as Kannibale Oskar Wagenknecht
 Baader (2002), as Kurt Krone
  (2002, TV film), as Rocco
 Angst (2003), as Klaus
 Sternzeichen (2003), as Kanzleichef Boley
  (2003, TV film), as Kaspar's Father
 Mein Name ist Bach (2003), as Johann Sebastian Bach
 Agnes and His Brothers (2004), as Günther Tschirner
  (2004, TV film), as Julien Lacroix
 Mutterseelenallein (2005), as Anwalt
  (2006), as Hermit
 Four Minutes (2006), as Gerhard von Loeben
  (2006), as Edmond
 Operation Guardian Angel (2009, TV film), as Werner Sievert
 Hitler's Grave (2010), as Grand Rabbi
 Borgia (2011, TV Series), as Cardinal Jorge da Costa
 Jack Irish (Two Australian television films) (2012), as Charlie Taub
  (2012), as Abraham Rabenthal

Director
 Desperado City (1981)
 Dies rigorose Leben (1983)
  (1987)
 Rising to the Bait (1992)
 Das Haus der schlafenden Schönen (2006)

References

External links

1941 births
2012 deaths
German male film actors
German male television actors
Mass media people from Schleswig-Holstein
People from Eutin
20th-century German male actors
21st-century German male actors
Directors of Caméra d'Or winners